The 1992–93 NBA season was the Jazz's 19th season in the National Basketball Association, and 14th season in Salt Lake City, Utah. During the off-season, the Jazz acquired Jay Humphries and Larry Krystkowiak from the Milwaukee Bucks. Salt Lake City hosted the 1993 NBA All-Star Game, and their star players Karl Malone and John Stockton were both selected, and were both named co-MVPs. Malone and Stockton both continued to be among the best players in the NBA, as the Jazz won six of their first eight games on their way to a 24–10 start. However, they struggled down the stretch with a 6–8 record in February, including a five-game losing streak between February and March. The Jazz held a 33–18 record at the All-Star break, but would play below .500 for the remainder of the season. During the final month of the regular season, the team signed free agent James Donaldson, who played in the final six games. The Jazz finished third in the Midwest Division with a 47–35 record. They made their tenth consecutive trip to the playoffs.

Malone was named to the All-NBA First Team, averaging 27.0 points and 11.2 rebounds per game, and finished tied in eighth place in Most Valuable Player voting, while Stockton was named to the All-NBA Second Team averaging 15.1 points, 12.0 assists and 2.4 steals per game. Jeff Malone finished second on the team in scoring averaging 18.1 points per game, and Tyrone Corbin provided the team with 11.6 points, 6.2 rebounds and 1.3 steals per game.

In the Western Conference First Round of the playoffs, the Jazz took a 2–1 lead over the Seattle SuperSonics, but lost the series in five games. Following the season, Krystkowiak signed as a free agent with the Orlando Magic, and Mike Brown was traded to the Minnesota Timberwolves.

Draft picks
The Jazz had no draft picks in 1992.

Roster

Regular season

Season standings

y – clinched division title
x – clinched playoff spot

z – clinched division title
y – clinched division title
x – clinched playoff spot

Record vs. opponents

Game log

Playoffs

|- align="center" bgcolor="#ffcccc"
| 1
| April 30
| @ Seattle
| L 85–99
| Karl Malone (24)
| Karl Malone (13)
| John Stockton (7)
| Seattle Center Coliseum14,429
| 0–1
|- align="center" bgcolor="#ccffcc"
| 2
| May 2
| @ Seattle
| W 89–85
| Karl Malone (26)
| Karl Malone (9)
| John Stockton (12)
| Seattle Center Coliseum14,513
| 1–1
|- align="center" bgcolor="#ccffcc"
| 3
| May 4
| Seattle
| W 90–80
| Karl Malone (23)
| Eaton, Corbin (9)
| John Stockton (10)
| Delta Center19,911
| 2–1
|- align="center" bgcolor="#ffcccc"
| 4
| May 6
| Seattle
| L 80–93
| Karl Malone (21)
| Karl Malone (12)
| John Stockton (15)
| Delta Center19,911
| 2–2
|- align="center" bgcolor="#ffcccc"
| 5
| May 8
| @ Seattle
| L 92–100
| Karl Malone (26)
| Karl Malone (12)
| John Stockton (11)
| Seattle Center Coliseum14,812
| 2–3
|-

Player statistics

Season

Playoffs

Player Statistics Citation:

Awards and records
 Karl Malone, All-NBA First Team
 John Stockton, All-NBA Second Team

Transactions

References

See also
 1992–93 NBA season

Utah Jazz seasons
Utah
Utah
Utah